Gustav Just (16 June 1921 – 23 February 2011) was First Secretary of the German Writers' Association (DSV) and editor-in-chief of the East German weekly Sonntag until 1957, when he was sentenced to four years imprisonment after a show trial in which he was accused of having engaged in anti-constitutional activities ("inciting to boycott") along with Walter Janka, Heinz Zöger, and Richard Wolf.  He was born in Reinowitz, Bohemia.

After his release he became a prolific translator of primarily Czech but also Slovak works into German and was "rehabilitated" in 1990.

He served in the Brandenburg State Parliament (as its Alterspräsident, or "chairman by seniority") in the newly unified Germany until he was forced to resign in 1992 following allegations of having participated in wartime atrocities on the Eastern Front during World War II.

In 1998 he received the Johann-Heinrich-Voß-Preis für Übersetzung.

Publications 

Zeuge in eigener Sache: Die fünfziger Jahre in der DDR, Berlin: Luchterhand, Morgenbuch, 1990.
Witness in His Own Cause: The Fifties in the German Democratic Republic, Lanham, MD: University Press of America, 1995.
Deutsch, Jahrgang 1921: Ein Lebensbericht, Potsdam: Verlag für Berlin und Brandenburg, 2001.

References

1921 births
2011 deaths
People from Jablonec nad Nisou
Sudeten German people
Czechoslovak people of German descent
Naturalized citizens of Germany
Socialist Unity Party of Germany members
Social Democratic Party of Germany politicians
Members of the Landtag of Brandenburg
20th-century German translators
20th-century German male writers
German male non-fiction writers
German military personnel of World War II